Gjelbrim Izir Taipi (born 13 December 1992) is a Kosovan professional footballer who plays as an attacking midfielder for FK Kukësi and the Kosovo national team.

Early life
Taipi was born in Bujanovac, FR Yugoslavia from Albanian parents from Veliki Trnovac and is the older brother of Skënderbeu Korçë player Shqiprim Taipi.

Club career

Tërnoci
In his youth, Taipi joined his local football team Tërnoci. Moving up the ranks within the club, he eventually joined the senior team at the age of 17. In his first season at Tërnoci, he scored 17 goals in 31 appearances in the Pčinjska Liga and becoming the league's top scorer. He was regarded as a talented player and received transfer offers from Swiss club Young Boys, German club Rot-Weiß Oberhausen and Slovenian club Koper.

Shkëndija
Taipi made his first appearance for Shkëndija against Partizan in the home leg of the second qualifying round of 2011–12 UEFA Champions League. In his first season at Shkëndija, he made twenty six appearances, scored two goals and four assists. He had integrated himself well into the Shkëndija squad and helped Shkëndija to third place in the 2011–12 season.

During his second season, Taipi became a key member of the Shkëndija and he was involved in the first qualifying round of 2012–13 UEFA Europa League against Portadown. He became a favored player by the fans when and on 7 October, he scored a long distance goal and assisted a second to Muzafer Ejupi against Shkëndija's rival, Vardar at home. The next week, he scored his second goal of the season against Drita. At the end of the season, it was expected Taipi would move abroad, with speculation indicating Switzerland.

Wil
On 9 June 2013. Taipi officially signed with Swiss Challenge League side Wil for two years. On 21 July 2013, he made his debut in a match against Chiasso after being named in the starting line-up and scored his side's the first goal during a 3–0 away win.

Schaffhausen
On 16 January 2017. Taipi joined Swiss Challenge League side Schaffhausen. On 5 February 2017, he made his debut in a 2–2 away draw against Aarau after being named in the starting line-up.

St. Gallen
On 1 July 2017. Taipi joined Swiss Super League side St. Gallen. On 9 September 2017, he made his debut in a 3–3 away draw against Lausanne-Sport after coming on as a substitute in the 63rd minute in place of Danijel Aleksić.

Grasshoppers
On 16 January 2018. Taipi signed Swiss Super League side Grasshoppers. On 4 February 2018, he made his debut in a 1–3 away win against Sion after being named in the starting line-up.

International career

Albania

Under-21
On 6 June 2012. Taipi made his debut with Albania U21 in a 2013 UEFA European Under-21 Championship qualification match against Portugal U21 after being named in the starting line-up.

Kosovo
On 19 March 2018. Taipi received a call-up from Kosovo for the friendly matches against Madagascar and Burkina Faso. On 27 March 2018, he made his debut with Kosovo in a friendly match against Burkina Faso after being named in the starting line-up and he is the third player that comes from the Preševo Valley after Atdhe Nuhiu and Fidan Aliti.

Career statistics

Club

International

References

External links

1992 births
Living people
People from Bujanovac
Kosovo Albanians
Association football midfielders
Kosovan footballers
Kosovo international footballers
Albanian footballers
Albania youth international footballers
KF Shkëndija players
FC Wil players
FC Schaffhausen players
FC St. Gallen players
Grasshopper Club Zürich players
FC Winterthur players
FK Kukësi players
Macedonian First Football League players
Swiss Challenge League players
Swiss Super League players
Kategoria Superiore players
Kosovan expatriate footballers
Expatriate footballers in North Macedonia
Kosovan expatriate sportspeople in North Macedonia
Expatriate footballers in Switzerland
Kosovan expatriate sportspeople in Switzerland